Ginta Toramizu (虎水ギンタ Toramizu Ginta) is the protagonist of MÄR (Märchen Awakens Romance), an anime and manga series by Nobuyuki Anzai. He is the leader and captain of Team MÄR.

Background
Ginta was born in the city of Tokyo to his father Danna and his unnamed mother. As a child, Ginta would often be told stories of the fairytale land of MÄR-Heaven by his father, despite his mother's protests. At some point in his childhood, Ginta befriended Koyuki, who he harbored a secret crush on. While in first grade, Ginta had a hobby of making plastic models. One day, however, the class bully destroyed Ginta's model. Ginta, angry, attempted to fight the bully, but he lost miserably. Koyuki, who beat the bully up with a broom, would later help Ginta remake the model, telling him that if he stopped making models just because of a single bully, it would be like losing everything to him.

Once Ginta began to grow older, he would often play catch with his father near a nearby river. When Ginta was eight years old, Danna suddenly disappeared without a trace, much to the sorrows of the son and wife. Ginta's mother would take a job writing fairytales to pay for Ginta's education after Danna's disappearance. Koyuki often attempted cheering Ginta up after this by making Ginta cakes during school's free period, though, as Ginta revealed, they tasted awful.

Personality
A fun-loving, care-free boy with a ponytail who uses Babbo as his ÄRM. Ginta is a fourteen-year-old boy as a 2nd year student in Japan. He has always had a daydreaming problem; falling asleep in class happens on a regular basis. Ginta's dreams are about a fantasy world in which he is the hero. On many occasions he tells Koyuki, the only person who believes that his dreams are real, about the dreams and how one day he will go to the place he sees when he's asleep. Many of his classmates and teachers pick on him for sleeping in class and Ginta often ends up getting beat up or running around the school as punishment.

Ginta's mother doesn't like to hear of his dreams because of his father who disappeared about six years ago. He had the same dreams as well and she is worried that Ginta will leave her. She writes fairy tales, or märchen, for a living. She also playfully beats Ginta up for playing too many video games and slacking off at school.

One day, however, Ginta was sent to the fantasy world he dreamed of, MÄR Heaven. Being originally from another world (Earth) he was originally weak and nerdy (a stereotypical otaku) until he arrived in MÄR-Heaven, where he gained superior physical ability, 20/20 eyesight, and his path happened to coincide with that of the ÄRM of legend Babbo.

Ginta later finds out that he was brought to the fantasy world by a boy named Alviss so that he can save the world from the Chess Pieces.  He uses the unique ÄRM Babbo, which was used by the head of the Chess Pieces six years prior, to create Team and defeat the Chess once and for all. He harbors a secret crush on Koyuki, who eventually reciprocates his feelings as she journeys with Ginta as Snow.

Plot

Pre-War Games arc
One day in class, Ginta is teleported to the other world he had always dreamed about, MÄR Heaven. Once there, he is quick to enjoy the fantasy world and quickly discovers his increased strength. Along with Dorothy, Ginta goes into a cave and finds the ÄRM Babbo, who Ginta thereafter uses as his own personal ÄRM, much to Babbo's annoyance. Ginta then meets a farm-boy named Jack, and rescues his farm from two vegetarian werewolves. Shortly after that Ginta meets Alviss, who reveals he was the one who brought Ginta to MÄR Heaven and the reason he summoned Ginta: to fight the Chess Pieces, who are trying to take over MÄR Heaven. Although at first Alviss finds it hard to believe that Ginta could do so, he later warms up to Ginta and believes Ginta can do so.

After Alviss leaves, Ginta and Jack find a dog named Edward, who reveals that the princess of Lestava and his best friend, Snow, has frozen herself in a nearby castle to protect herself. Ginta and Jack, with Alviss and Dorothy following them, attempt to rescue her, but are stopped by two Chess Pieces named Ian and Loco, although the emergence of Alan, who was sealed within Edward, and Halloween saved both Jack and Ginta and Ian and Loco from death. The next day Alan put Snow, Ginta, Jack, and Dorothy in a three-day training session inside of the Training Gate, although to the four it would have actually been 180 days. During the three days they are training, the Chess Pieces begin to take action and take over a large chunk of MÄR Heaven. Once the four get out, they have a small battle with Ian and Gido, where in a show of their new strength none of them receive any harm. Once the battle in finished, the five of them together form Team MÄR

Team MÄR then heads south to the Hild continent, where they meet Nanashi, the leader of the Thieves Guild of Luberia and a major enemy of the Chess Pieces. Nanashi quickly befriends Team MÄR and joins them. With Nanashi's help, they all go to Vestry, a city which is under the attack of two powerful Chess Pieces, who are currently hiding inside Vestry's famous underwater cave. After splitting up in the cave, Ginta eventually meets Tom, and they quickly become friends. Ginta and Tom later find one of the two Chess Pieces, Girom, and defeats Girom using his newly found power, Gargoyle. Ginta then falls unconscious, and it is revealed the Tom is really the leader of the Chess Piece army, Phantom. Nanashi and Dorothy then take him back to Vestry, and that night it is revealed that the War Games will soon begin. MÄR then heads to Reginlief Castle to help fight in the War Games, and, surprisingly, only them and Alviss pass the preliminaries.

War Games arc
Ginta has a large number of battles in the War Games, and fought in all but one of the War Game rounds. In each battle Ginta will have trouble mentally as well as physically, and each fight gives him a new challenge, including fighting a seemingly un-win-able fight or having to fight someone whose reason for fighting is sympathetic.

During the War Games, Ginta soon finds out that Tom is really Phantom, and later he has a small unofficial fight with Phantom at Kaldea island, where Phantom quickly defeats an already exhausted Ginta, which later proves to be further determination for Ginta to win. In an anime filler arc, they also oppose the Zonnen, outcast Chess Pieces who are near Knight level. In the end, all of the Zonnen are trapped in the Training Gate forever.

 Ginta vs. Garon - 1st Round - Although at first Ginta has trouble fighting Garon due to his hardened body, Ginta is quick to turn the battle around with Gargoyle. Ginta also finds out in this battle that his father was the previous person from his world to be sent to MÄR Heaven and the hero of the last War Games.
 Ginta vs. Kannochi - 3rd Round - Kannochi quickly takes the advantage of the battle by using a Darkness ÄRM on Ginta, though Ginta reverses the curse by using Alice. A melting Kannochi then wishes him good luck in the future battles Ginta will fight.
 Ginta vs. Girom - 4th Round - A rematch between the two as requested by Girom. Just before the battle Girom killed Aqua, which quickly angered Ginta to the extent he couldn't use Babbo correctly. Babbo then calmed him down and Ginta used Gargoyle to send Girom into the sky to unknown whereabouts, although Girom is later revealed to survive.
 Ginta vs. Ash - 5th Round - By a request made by Ash, Ginta has his first battle against a Knight against Ash. Ginta soon learns the Ash's reasons for fighting is to protect children who would otherwise be killed in the wars of nations, although Ginta refuses to believe this and defeats Ash. Ash later turns out to be a valuable ally and friend.
 Ginta vs. Ian - 6th Round - For revenge in causing the punishment of Gido, Ian, now at Knight class, plans on defeating Ginta. Entirely out of his determination to save Snow (who was just kidnapped right before the battle), Ginta manages to defeat Ian, and Ian quits the Chess Pieces and vows to kill the one who punished Gido.
 Ginta vs. Phantom - Final Round - The last battle of the War Games, Ginta and Phantom continuously send blow after blow to each other, but in the end, Phantom is crushed by an enlargened Babbo, defeating the #1 Knight and winning the War Games.

Post-War Games arc
After the War Games are over, Team MÄR set out to find the King and Queen and rescue Snow, who King and Queen were going to use to open a portal to Ginta's world and take over Earth along with MÄR Heaven. During this point in the anime, there are several filler episodes that largely change the plot from the original manga.

Manga version
In the manga, shortly after defeating Phantom, Team MÄR are opposed by the King and Queen. The Queen, Diana, faces off against Dorothy, while the King, Danna-Orb fights Ginta. During their battle, King reveals that he isn't really Ginta's father, and that Ginta's father's real soul is Babbo's. Ginta removes Kaldea's Orb from King's body and puts Babbo's soul in the soul-less body, giving life back to Danna. Kaldea's Orb takes on its true form, but Ginta then defeats it and finally defeats the Chess Pieces. Afterwards, Ginta returns to Earth and reunites with his mother and Koyuki. Ginta cameos in the second last chapter of MÄR Omega, the sequel to MÄR, aware of the situation that occurred in MÄR Heaven in the sequel.

Anime version
While Ian pursues Chimera and Dorothy and Alviss fight Rolan and Candice, Alan and Ginta storm Lestava Castle to rescue Snow, and end up fighting Magical Lou, Snow's childhood caretaker and her kidnapper under Queen's orders. In the end, however, Magical Lou frees Snow in a way of apologizing for putting Snow through all she had gone through instead of helping her. Afterwards, they encounter Phantom's loyal vassals the Ghost Chess, and after defeating them, put an end to Phantom.

Once they return to Lestava Castle, King decides to take action and kill Team MÄR and their allies. In knight armor, King quickly disposes of Alan. While Ginta and Dorothy head to Caldia to free Kaldea's Elder from an ÄRM used on him, the rest of Team MÄR reunite with Pano, who reveals that her brother and father were also killed by King. Nanashi, Snow, and Alviss try to oppose King, but just before Ginta and Dorothy return the King kills both Nanashi and Snow, although they help Alviss escape. After Ian, Gido, and Ash return, Ginta, Dorothy, and Alviss learn of King and Queen's plan to take over Ginta's world, and their three friends try to oppose King, but Ash dies, and Ian and Gido promise to take care of his children's friends. Alviss is then the next to fight King, and King reveals that he is really Danna, the hero of the last War Games, and kills Alviss.

Ginta and Dorothy then return to Lestava Castle, and Dorothy fights Queen Diana, her own sister, and wins. Afterwards, King shows up and kills the weakened Dorothy just after Diana dies, and then fights Ginta. During battle, Ginta discovers that his father's soul was within Babbo all along while the Kaldea's Orb was in Danna's body. After Kaldea's orb is removed from Danna, Kaldea's Orb takes on its true form and invades Earth. With Kaldea's Orb on Earth, Ginta takes Babbo's Gargoyle to Earth for the final battle. Using the power of all people in MÄR Heaven, Ginta sends a devastating blow to Kaldea's Orb that destroys the orb forever. Afterwards, Alan, Garon, Leno, Nanashi, Dorothy, Ash, Fuugi, and Alviss are revived, and Ginta, with his father, return to their world. Once there, Danna reunites with his wife, and Ginta does so with Koyuki, who has merged with Snow to create one soul so that both of them could be with Ginta.

Ginta's ÄRM: Babbo

Babbo is the only known ÄRM in MÄR-Heaven with a human soul — which is actually the magic kingdom Kaldea's former Elder's, and therefore the only one able to talk without being activated. He is also able to 'download' personalities and carried King's before first War Games and Danna's afterwards. Once the weapon of the exceptionally powerful Chess Pieces Knight Phantom, it now is wielded by Ginta, and serves as both a friend and a weapon. Babbo is known for his oversized ego and love of himself, constantly referring to himself as an "elder" (in the English versions, a gentleman), comically in contrast to his typical shape, which is in default form an oversized kendama. In the end of the anime, Babbo lives with Chaton, Alan, and the baby Loco.

Babbo has many ways of attacking, different "versions" of Babbo that can attack. However, these versions cannot be accessed without the Magic Stones that are attributed to them. Babbo can also change sizes, which is why he weighs so much.

Before Ginta acquires any of these Stones, he uses the ÄRM like a kendama or just whips it around. However, this proves to be rather ineffective. Ginta later finds out that data is recorded in Babbo through his imagination; the greater the form imagined the more powerful it will be. In total there are eight spots for Magic Stones, four on each side. In the series, these different forms are referred to as "versions".

Version 1-A: Hammer ÄRM; 1-B: Dagger ÄRM
 Ginta's fist and Babbo merge to create a metal ball (hammer) or a dagger. In this mode Babbo can telepathically communicate with Ginta. This version is mainly used for close range fighting.

Version 2: Bubble Launcher
 Babbo turns into a gun with which Ginta can fire exploding bubbles that look like Babbo. Ginta uses this for long range fighting or as cover.

Version 3: Gargoyle
 Gargoyle takes a lot of magical power to use. Babbo turns into a giant Gargoyle creature that levitates above the ground on a giant crystal and holds a ring in his mouth. He can use the ring to fire a strong beam, but it uses a lot of magical power. Because this version is a guardian ÄRM Ginta can't move when he uses it, but it also is very dangerous; if he is reckless with it, Ginta's spirit energy will be crushed. It was first sighted in the underground lake defeating Girom, and blasting a way out for lost souls of an old ship to escape.

Version 4: Alice
 Babbo turns into an angelic female Holy ÄRM that uses healing magic, which is effective for counter-attack and protection against Darkness ÄRMs. Babbo is embarrassed after the transformation. Ginta first used it in the battle with Kannochi. He attempts to use it to undo the curses placed on Ed/Alan and Alviss. It is successful for Ed and Allan but fails for Alviss. Nanashi and Jack think Alice is beautiful.

Version 5: Cushion Jelly
 Babbo turns into a giant pudding that covers Ginta entirely and absorbs all physically destructive attacks used by the enemy. The one drawback is that this move will render Ginta motionless. He first used this ability during his second battle with Girom during the War Games.

Version 6: Puss in Boots
 Babbo turns into a giant fish-wielding Puss in Boots, gaining immense speed and the ability to use other ÄRMs. He first uses this ability during his final fight with Phantom.

Version 7: Union
 A spell that reunites the separated. Ginta uses it to revive his friends and father after they are killed by Danna-orb.

Version 8: Reverse Gate Keeper Clown (manga only)
 Babbo transforms into an exact replica of the Gate Keeper Clown allowing a certain number of people, determined by the dice roll of the Gate Keeper, to go into the real world from MÄR-Heaven. Ginta and his dad meet up with Koyuki and return home.

Version 8: Omega Gargoyle (anime only)
 This is a stronger version of Gargoyle with the hopes and dreams of every person in MÄR-Heaven.

Trivia
 Babbo's name actually means "father" in Italian, hinting at Babbo's true identity (at least when Ginta acquires him) as Ginta's father, Danna.
 Ginta & Babbo appeared on the cover of a shōnen JUMP magazine read by Ko Kitamura in Mitsuru Adachi's Anime Cross Game.

Reception
IGN commented that Ginta is a combination of every shōnen manga protagonist made before him, thus stopping the readers from having any special feelings towards him. They also begin the review by mistakenly calling him Cloud on purpose, who is the protagonist of Final Fantasy VII, referring to the similarity between their hair and clothing.

References

External links

MÄR
Fictional military captains
Fictional princes
Fictional Japanese people in anime and manga
Child characters in anime and manga